Attitude City is the third studio album by the American musical comedy duo Ninja Sex Party. The album was released on July 17, 2015. Six tracks from the album, "Party of Three," "Dragon Slayer," "Attitude City," "Why I Cry," "Peppermint Creams," and "Road Trip" were all released as singles on their YouTube channel prior to its release. It was a commercial success, especially in the comedy music sector.

The song "6969" features Steel Panther singer Michael Starr, and references Steel Panther's song "Into the Future" from their 2011 album Balls Out, which is also set in the year 6969.

Track listing

Personnel

Ninja Sex Party
 Dan Avidan – vocals
 Brian Wecht – music, production

Guests
 Super Guitar Bros – acoustic guitar (track 3)
 Arin Hanson – guest vocals (tracks 7, 8, 9 and 12)
 Michael Starr – guest vocals (track 12)

Crew
 David Dominguez – co-producer, recording
 Dan Castellani, Jr. – mixing
 Hans DeKline – mastering

Charts

Weekly charts

Year-end charts

References

2015 albums
Ninja Sex Party albums